Eddie Heatley is a New Zealand former rugby league footballer who represented New Zealand in the 1970 World Cup.

Playing career
Heatley played for the Otahuhu Leopards in the Auckland Rugby League competition and also represented Auckland. In 1970 he was selected for the New Zealand national rugby league team and played at the 1970 World Cup. He was also involved in the 1971 victory over Australia at Carlaw Park. In 1971 he won the Bert Humphries Medal as most improved forward in the ARL competition.

He spent the 1973 and 1974 seasons with the North Sydney Bears in the NSWRL Premiership.

References

Living people
New Zealand rugby league players
New Zealand national rugby league team players
Auckland rugby league team players
Otahuhu Leopards players
North Sydney Bears players
Rugby league locks
Place of birth missing (living people)
Year of birth missing (living people)